Edinburgh Tigers (formerly known as Pentland Tigers) is a basketball club based in Edinburgh, Scotland.  The club is a member of the Lothian Basketball Association (LBA) and plays in the Lothian League Division 1.  Edinburgh Tigers normally train at Cameron House Community Centre on Tuesday evenings, and play matches on a Friday night at Westwoods Health Club.

2011/12 Roster

Notable former players

History
The Edinburgh Tigers were formed in 1992.

1992 establishments in Scotland
Basketball teams established in 1992
Basketball teams in Scotland
Sports teams in Edinburgh